Dösener See is an alpine lake of Carinthia, Austria. It is part of the High Tauern National Park.

Geography

The lake is situated at 2270 metres above the Adriatic (7,450 ft) in the Ankogel Group of the High Tauern range, part of the Central Eastern Alps. It marks the head of the narrow Dösen Valley, stretching about  up from Mallnitz in the west.

Even in summer, the surface temperature never exceeds ; the lake is covered by ice up to three quarters of a year. In Dösener See, Arctic char are found as well as plankton species like rotifer and green algae.

The Arthur-von-Schmid-Haus, an Alpine club hut erected in 1910–11, stands on the western shore. From here, mountain trails lead to neighbouring summits such as the Hochalmspitze and the Reisseck massif.

External links

Arthur-von-Schmid-Haus 

Lakes of Carinthia (state)
Tarns of the Alps